Bernardo Rachetti (1639–1702) was an Italian painter of the Baroque period, active as a painter of imaginary vedute.

He was born in Milan, the nephew and scholar of Giovanni Ghisolfi. He painted architectural views and perspectives (capricci) in the style of his instructor, for whose pictures Racchetti's are not infrequently mistaken. They usually represent seaports embellished with magnificent buildings.

References

1639 births
1702 deaths
17th-century Italian painters
Italian male painters
18th-century Italian painters
Painters from Milan
Italian Baroque painters
18th-century Italian male artists